"If You Don't Wanna Love Me" may refer to

 a song by Tamar Braxton from the album Tamar
 a song by Cowboy Troy from the album Loco Motive
 a song by James Morrison from the album Songs for You, Truths for Me